The Kimberley rocket frog (Litoria axillaris) is a species of small frog that is endemic to Western Australia. The species epithet axillaris refers to the stripes on the sides of the body.

Description
The species grows up to 25.5 mm long, and has a triangular head with a pointed snout, and long limbs with half-webbed toes. It is pale greyish-brown with dark lateral stripes extending from the snout through the eyes and along the sides of the body.

Distribution and habitat
The frog has only been recorded from the Prince Regent National Park, in the north-west Kimberley region of north-western Australia, where it has been observed on sandstone rock platforms.

Researchers have heard the male frogs calling in pairs or alone, not in large groups as occurs with other frogs.

References

 
Litoria
Endemic fauna of Australia
Frogs of Australia
Amphibians of Western Australia
Amphibians described in 2011
Taxa named by Paul Doughty